Parablechnum camfieldii, synonym Blechnum camfieldii is known as the eared swamp fern. Often found near saline areas, or low-lying coastal sites in eastern Australia. The new growth is often pink in colour. Named after Julius Henry Camfield (Wd), a gardener at the Royal Botanic Gardens, Sydney.

References

Blechnaceae
Flora of New South Wales
Flora of Queensland